Paint by number is a painting technique where each area is marked with a number that corresponds to a particular color.

Paint by number(s) may also refer to:

Paint by Number (album), a music album by the band 3
Paint by Number Songs, an album by Sole
"Paint by Numbers", a track on the album 24 Carrots by Al Stewart
Nonogram, a type of picture logic puzzle often called Paint by Numbers